Jozef Sivák (14 January 1886, in Bobrovec – 27 January 1959, in Bratislava) was the Prime Minister of the Autonomy Government of Slovakia of the Second Czechoslovak Republic from 9 March 1939 to 11 March 1939. He was a member of the HSĽS and the minister of education of the Nazi Slovak State from 1939 to 1944.

See also
Prime Minister of Slovakia

References 

Slovak politicians
1886 births
1959 deaths
Prime Ministers of Slovakia